The Philadelphia Inquirer Open was a golf tournament on the PGA Tour that was played at various clubs in the greater Philadelphia area in the 1940s. The first event played as the Philadelphia Inquirer Open Invitational; it was last played in 1949. Fred Byrod was the Inquirer employee who acted as tournament promoter and liaison with the PGA. At the 1945 event, Byron Nelson won the seventh of his record-setting 11 consecutive victories.

Tournament hosts

Winners

References

Former PGA Tour events
Golf in Pennsylvania